West Virginia's 2nd congressional district consists of the northern half of the state.  It contains Barbour, Berkeley, Brooke, Doddridge, Grant, Hampshire, Hancock, Hardy, Harrison, Jefferson, Lewis, Marion, Marshall, Mineral, Monongalia, Morgan, Ohio, Pleasants, Preston, Randolph, Ritchie, Taylor, Tucker, Tyler, Upshur, Wetzel, and Wood counties.

The district is currently represented by Alex Mooney, a Republican.

George W. Bush carried the district twice in 2000 with 54% of the vote and in 2004 with 57% of the vote. John McCain also won the district in 2008 with 54.63% of the vote while Barack Obama received 43.77%.

History

The Second District as originally formed in 1863 included Taylor, Marion, Monongalia, Preston, Tucker, Barbour, Upshur, Webster, Pocahontas, Randolph, Pendleton, Hardy, Hampshire, Berkeley, and Morgan counties (Jefferson county's status in the state was still in dispute, and Grant and Mineral counties were still part of other counties, but the modern territory of all was also included).  It was essentially the successor of Virginia's 10th congressional district. The district was unchanged for 1882.

In 1902, the district was changed to Monongalia, Preston, Tucker, Taylor, Barbour, Tucker, Randolph, Pendleton, Grant, Hardy, Mineral, Hampshire, Morgan, Berkeley, and Jefferson counties.  The district was unchanged for 1916.  Taylor was removed for 1934.  The district was again unchanged for 1954.   In 1962 Upshur, Webster, Pocahontas, and Greenbrier counties were added.  In 1972, Lewis, Monroe, Summers, and Fayette were added.  In 1982, Barbour was added.

1992 saw the district consist of Berkeley, Braxton, Calhoun, Clay, Glimer, Hampshire, Hardy, Jackson, Jefferson, Kanawha, Lewis, Mason, Morgan, Nicholas, Pendleton, Putnam, Randolph, Roane, Upshur, and Wirt counties.  In 2002, Gilmer and Nicholas were removed and for the election cycle beginning in 2012, Mason was removed.

Responding to the 2020 Census, the district was reconstituted to contain Barbour, Berkeley, Brooke, Doddridge, Grant, Hampshire, Hancock, Hardy, Harrison, Jefferson, Lewis, Marion, Marshall, Mineral, Monongalia, Morgan, Ohio, Pleasants, Preston, Randolph, Ritchie, Taylor, Tucker, Tyler, Upshur, Wetzel, and Wood.
.

Recent presidential elections

2022 Republican primary

The legislature placed both previous 1st District congressman David McKinley and the previous 2nd District congressman Alex Mooney in the new 2nd District,setting up a Republican primary race between Mooney and McKinley.  In the Republican Primary held on May 10, 2022, Mooney, who was endorsed by Donald Trump, easily defeated McKinley, who was endorsed by Democrat Joe Manchin 54% to 36%, with three minor candidates receiving the balance.     Mooney then easily won the general election.

List of members representing the district

Recent election results

2000s

2010s

2020s

Historical district boundaries

See also

West Virginia's congressional districts
List of United States congressional districts

References
Specific

General

 Congressional Biographical Directory of the United States 1774–present

02